This is a list of the last Lords of Appeal in Ordinary and other Lords of Appeal before the judicial functions of the House of Lords ended in 2009.

Last Lords of Appeal in Ordinary
As of 30 September 2009, (the day before their functions were transferred to the Supreme Court of the United Kingdom), the Lords of Appeal in Ordinary appointed under section 6 of the Appellate Jurisdiction Act 1876 were, in order of seniority:

Last Lords of Appeal
As of 30 September 2009, the other Lords of Appeal who were, by virtue of sections 5 & 25 of the Appellate Jurisdiction Act 1876, eligible to form the quorum (3) of the House of Lords necessary to hear and determine judicial business were:
The date in parentheses is the date after which the Lord of Appeal is disqualified from participating in judicial business. The date is set by the Judicial Pensions and Retirement Act 1993.
 Eligible Lords

See also
 Judicial functions of the House of Lords

References

Lords of Appeal in Ordinary
 
Lords of Appeal